The Young One (original title: Jeunesse) is a 2016 French-Portuguese film directed by Julien Samani and produced by Paulo Branco. The film is based on the 1898 short story "Youth" by Joseph Conrad. The film premiered at the 2016 Locarno International Film Festival, where it competed for the Golden Leopard.

Cast 
 Kévin Azaïs as Zico
 Samir Guesmi as José Géraud
 Jean-François Stévenin as Captain Paillet
 Bastien Ughetto as Yoyo
 Camille Polet as Mélanie
 Lazare Minoungou as Moctar
 David Chour as Kong
 Miguel Borges as Pedro
 António Simão as Lionel

References

External links 
 
 

2016 films
2016 drama films
2010s French-language films
French drama films
Portuguese drama films
Seafaring films
Films based on short fiction
Films produced by Paulo Branco
Films based on works by Joseph Conrad
2010s French films